Eboda is a genus of moths belonging to the family Tortricidae.

Species
Eboda bryochlora Diakonoff, 1960
Eboda chloroclistis Razowski, 1964
Eboda chrisitis Razowski, 1964
Eboda diakonoffi Razowski, 1964
Eboda discobola Diakonoff, 1948
Eboda dissimilis Liu & Bai, 1986
Eboda ethnia Razowski, 1991
Eboda smaragdinana Walker, 1866
Eboda virescens Razowski, 1964

See also
List of Tortricidae genera

References

 , 2005: World Catalogue of Insects vol. 5 Tortricidae.
 , 1986: A study of the Chinese Eboda Walker (Lepidoptera: Tortricidae). Sinozoologia 4: 151–154.
 , 1866, List Specimens lepid. Insects Colln. Br. Mus. 35: 1804

External links
tortricidae.com

Tortricidae genera
Tortricini